Ammon  (in Arabic عمون) also known as Ammon News is a private news agency and alternative news body based in Amman, Jordan. It is the first online newspaper in the country. The agency has both Arabic and English language websites. The name of the agency, Ammon, refers to ancient name of Amman, capital city of Jordan.

History and profile
Ammon News was launched in 2006 by Sameer Al Hayari and Bassel Elkour, being the first online newspaper of Jordan.

Elkour is also the editor-in-chief of the news portal. Wael Jaraisheh is the managing editor of Ammon News. He also contributes to the website in parliamentary affairs. The agency which is run from a cafe in Amman describes itself as voice to the "silent majority". It provides news which is not published in print media through its both Arabic and English news portals. 

Based on the 2010 Alexa data Ammon News had a readership of 38%, making it the most visited website in Jordan. As of 2011 it was the most popular website in the country with 250,000 daily visitors according to Alexa. It was the fifth most visited website in the Arab world in 2012. In a market study carried out by Ipsos in March 2012 it was established that Ammon News was among the top 20 most visited websites in the country along with two other news portals, namely Saraya and Khaberni.

Attacks and blocks
In February 2011, the website of Ammon News was disabled following the publication of a statement by 36 leading Jordanian tribesmen who called for democratic and economic reforms in Jordan. In addition, unknown people also attacked the owners of the news portal on the same date. Randa Habib, a veteran journalist, published articles in a column in English and Arabic portals of the Ammon News until June 2011 when the Jordanian government implemented pressure related to the statement mentioned above. Regarding the hacking Bassel Elkour argued that it had been perpetrated by Jordan Intelligence. The Jordanian authorities denied his claim.

The website was blocked, temporarily, by the Jordanian government in June 2013 when it refused to comply the new press law in order to protest it.

References

External links
 Official website

2006 establishments in Jordan
Arabic-language websites
English-language websites
Jordanian news websites
Mass media in Amman
Publications established in 2006